Derryloran is a civil parish mainly in County Tyrone, Northern Ireland, with some areas in County Londonderry. It is situated in the historic baronies of Dungannon Upper in County Tyrone and Loughinsholin in County Londonderry. It is also a townland (also known as Kirkstown) of 174 acres.

Civil parish of Derryloran
The civil parish includes the town of Cookstown.

Townlands
The civil parish contains the following townlands:

Annahavil
Ardcumber
Ardvarnish
Auglish
Ballyforlea
Ballygroogan
Ballyloughan
Ballymenagh
Ballynasollus
Ballyreagh
Ballysudden
Claggan
Clare
Cloghog
Cluntydoon
Cookstown
Coolkeeghan
Coolnafranky
Coolnahavil
Coolreaghs
Craigs
Cranfield
Derrycrummy
Derryloran (also known as Kirkstown)
Doorless
Drumard
Drumcraw
Drumearn
Drumgarrell
Drummond
Drumrot
Dunman
Feegarran
Gallanagh
Glebe
Gortalowry
Gortin
Gortreagh
Kilcronagh
Killybearn
Killycurragh
Killymam
Killymoon Demesne
Kirkstown (also known as Derryloran)
Knockacunny
Loughry
Loughry Demesne
Loy
Maloon
Monrush
Moveagh
New Buildings
Rockhead
Scotchtown
Strifehill
Sullenboy
Tamlaghtmore
Terressan
Toberlane
Tullagh
Tullyboy
Tullycall
Tullygare
Tullywiggan

See also 
List of townlands in County Tyrone
List of civil parishes of County Tyrone

References

 
Townlands of County Tyrone